Robert J. H. Morrison (born 6 January 1961) is a Canadian author, editor, and academic.  He is British Academy Global Professor at Bath Spa University and Queen's National Scholar at Queen's University, Kingston, Ontario. A scholar of late eighteenth- and nineteenth-century literature and culture, he is particularly interested in the Regency years (1811-1820), Blackwood's Edinburgh Magazine, Jane Austen, and Thomas De Quincey.

Early life 
Morrison was born and raised in Lethbridge, Alberta. He was educated at the University of Lethbridge, where he gained a Bachelor of Arts in English in 1983. He later pursued a Master of Philosophy at the University of Oxford, which he completed in 1987. In 1991, Morrison earned his PhD at the University of Edinburgh.

Academic career
Morrison is British Academy Global Professor at Bath Spa University and Queen's National Scholar at Queen's University in Kingston, Ontario. He was elected Fellow of the Royal Society of Canada in 2017.  He received the University of Lethbridge Distinguished Alumnus of the Year award in 2013. He has been the recipient of a number of teaching awards, including the Frank Knox Award for Excellence in Teaching (2006, 2008, 2014), the W. J. Barnes Award for Excellence in Teaching (2006, 2018), and the Ontario Undergraduate Student Alliance Teaching Award (2008). Morrison maintains the Thomas De Quincey Homepage, a site devoted to the study of the life and writings of its namesake.

Writer
Morrison’s most recent book, The Regency Years, During Which Jane Austen Writes, Napoleon Fights, Byron Makes Love, and Britain Becomes Modern was published in North America by W. W. Norton.  Under the title The Regency Revolution: Jane Austen, Napoleon, Lord Byron, and the Making of the Modern World, it was published in Britain by Atlantic. The Regency Years was longlisted for the RBC Taylor Prize, and named by The Economist as one of its 2019 Books of the Year.  As The Regency Revolution, it was also longlisted for the Elma Dangerfield Prize and shortlisted for the Historical Writers’ Association Crown Award for the best in historical non-fiction.

Morrison’s 2009 biography of Thomas De Quincey—The English Opium-Eater—was shortlisted for the James Tait Black Memorial Prize in Biography. He is the co-general editor of The Selected Works of Leigh Hunt, and editor of Hunt’s essays, 1822–38 (Pickering and Chatto, 2003). He is the editor of three volumes of the Works of Thomas De Quincey, and co-editor of a fourth (Pickering and Chatto, 2000–03). With Daniel Sanjiv Roberts, he edited Romanticism and Blackwood's Magazine: "An Unprecedented Phenomenon" (2013) and Thomas De Quincey: New Theoretical and Critical Directions (2008).  For Oxford University Press, he edited Thomas De Quincey's Confessions of an English Opium-Eater and Other Writings (2013), and Thomas De Quincey's On Murder (Oxford, 2006), and co-edited (with Chris Baldick) The Vampyre and Other Tales of the Macabre (1997), and Tales of Terror from Blackwood's Magazine (1995).  He produced Jane Austen's Pride and Prejudice: A Sourcebook for Routledge (2005), and he edited Richard Woodhouse's Cause Book: The Opium-Eater, the Magazine Wars and the London Literary Scene in 1821 as a complete issue of the Harvard Library Bulletin (1998).

Personal life
Morrison is married to Carole Beaudin. They have two children.

Bibliography
The Regency Revolution: Jane Austen, Napoleon, Lord Byron, and the Making of the Modern World. Atlantic, 2019. 
The Regency Years, During Which Jane Austen Writes, Napoleon Fights, Byron Makes Love, and Britain Becomes Modern. W. W. Norton. 2019.
The 21st-Century Oxford Authors: Thomas De Quincey. Oxford University Press. 2019.

Co-editor with Daniel Sanjiv Roberts, 

Co-editor with Daniel Sanjiv Roberts, 

Co-editor with Chris Baldick, 
Co-editor with Chris Baldick,

References

External links
 

1961 births
Academic staff of Queen's University at Kingston
Living people
Academics of Bath Spa University
Writers from Lethbridge